Derek Robert Wallace (born September 1, 1971) is an American former professional baseball pitcher. Wallace pitched two seasons in Major League Baseball (MLB). He attended college at Pepperdine. In 1996, he played for the New York Mets and in 1999 he played for the Kansas City Royals. Wallace compiled a career record of 2-4 in 27 games and an ERA of 3.82. Wallace batted and threw right-handed.

A native of Van Nuys, California, Wallace attended Chatsworth High School and Pepperdine University. In 1991, he played collegiate summer baseball with the Chatham A's of the Cape Cod Baseball League, and was named the league's outstanding pro prospect. He was selected by the Chicago Cubs in the first round of the 1992 MLB Draft. He holds the distinction of having tied an MLB record by striking out four batters in one inning.

See also
 List of Major League Baseball single-inning strikeout leaders

References

External links

1971 births
Living people
Baseball players at the 1999 Pan American Games
Baseball players from California
Binghamton Mets players
Chatham Anglers players
Daytona Cubs players
Gulf Coast Mets players
Iowa Cubs players
Kansas City Royals players
Major League Baseball pitchers
New York Mets players
Norfolk Tides players
Orlando Cubs players
Pan American Games medalists in baseball
Pan American Games silver medalists for the United States
People from Van Nuys, Los Angeles
Pepperdine Waves baseball players
Peoria Chiefs players
St. Lucie Mets players
United States national baseball team players
Wichita Wranglers players
Medalists at the 1999 Pan American Games
American expatriate baseball players in Australia
Chatsworth High School alumni